Noor abad also Romanized as noor abad and Noor abad; also known as Noor abad) is a village in Tarand Rural District, Jalilabad District, Pishva County, Tehran Province, Iran. At the 2006 census, its population was 511, in 123 families.

References 

Populated places in Pishva County